Marcella Tonioli (born 31 May 1986) is an Italian compound archer. She is the current World Archery number two in women's compound archery. This is also the highest position she has ever achieved until now.

Palmares

2011
 EMAU Grand Prix, mixed team, Antalya
5th, EMAU Grand Prix, individual, Antalya
4th, World Cup, women's team, Poreč
6th, World Cup, mixed team, Poreč
9th, World Cup, individual, Poreč
 2011 Archery European Indoor Championships, Cambrils
 2011 Archery European Indoor Championships, Cambrils
 EMAU Grand Prix, women's team, Boé
 EMAU Grand Prix, mixed team, Boé
4th, EMAU Grand Prix, individual, Boé
6th, World Cup, individual, Antalya
7th, World Cup, women's team, Antalya
 2011 World Archery Championships, mixed team, Turin
5th, 2011 World Archery Championships, women's team, Turin
6th, 2011 World Archery Championships, individual, Turin
 World Cup, individual, Ogden
 World Cup, mixed team, Ogden
5th, World Cup, individual, Shanghai
 World Cup Final, individual, Istanbul
2012
4th, World Indoor Championships, women's team, Las Vegas
17th, World Indoor Championships, individual, Las Vegas
 World Cup, individual, Shanghai
 World Cup, women's team, Shanghai
 World Cup, women's team, Antalya
 World Cup, mixed team, Antalya
 World Cup, individual, Antalya
 European Outdoor Championships, women's team, Amsterdam
 European Outdoor Championships, mixed team, Amsterdam
 European Outdoor Championships, individual, Amsterdam
2013
 2013 Archery European Indoor Championships, women's team Rzeszow
 World Cup, mixed team, Shanghai
 World Cup, mixed team, Antalya
 World Cup, mixed team, Medellin
 World Games, compound mixed team, Cali
 World Cup, women's team, Wroclaw
 World Cup, mixed  team, Paris
 World Championships, mixed team, Antalya

References

External links

Italian female archers
Living people
1986 births
World Archery Championships medalists
European Games competitors for Italy
Archers at the 2019 European Games
21st-century Italian women